The Stronghold Society is a non-profit organization that advocates for skateboarding with a focus on creating and sustaining skateparks in Native American communities.

Organization 
The Stronghold Society was founded by Walt Pourier, Mark "Monk" Hubbard, James Murphy, and Jeff Ament. Pourier is the current executive director of the organization.

Wounded Knee Four Directions Skatepark Program 
Walt and the Stronghold Society teamed up with Wounded Knee Skateboards to bring the Wounded Knee 4-Directions Skatepark to kids on Pine Ridge reservation in South Dakota. The park opened in Pine Ridge Village in 2011.

Arts programs 
The Stronghold Society runs arts programs for youth.

Mental health campaigns 
The organization also runs media campaigns promoting youth mental health.

References

External links 
Official website
STRONGER TOGETHER | Up Mountain Switchel x Stronghold Society
Skateboarding organizations
501(c)(3) organizations
Native American organizations
Social welfare charities based in the United States
Sports foundations based in the United States
Sports charities